Merlin is a digital rights music licensing partner for independent record labels, distributors, and other music rights holders around the world. It was founded in 2007 with Charles Caldas as the chief executive. In January 2020, Jeremy Sirota stepped into the role of Merlin CEO. The company is a member-based organization representing the digital licensing rights for hundreds of independent labels and distributors in nearly every country around the globe. As of 2019, Merlin has paid out over two billion dollars.

History 
Merlin was launched in early 2007 at the Marché International du Disque et de l'Edition Musicale in Cannes. The company was founded by Alison Wenham (WIN), Michel Lambot [PIAS], Tom Silverman (Tommy Boy) and Martin Mills (Beggars Group); Charles Caldas was the first chief executive. The organization's first commercial deal was a 2008 license with Spotify as one of the then-regional streaming service's original licensing partners.

The company has negotiated settlements for copyright infringement with distributors such as Grooveshark, Limewire and XM Satellite Radio. Its content has been distributed through TikTok, Facebook/Instagram, Deezer, Pandora Music, SoundCloud, Spotify, Vevo, YouTube Premium and other services.

In February 2013, Merlin and IMPALA signed an agreement with Warner Music Group after it acquired Parlophone, to transfer 30% of that label's value to Merlin and IMPALA members. The divestment ended with the transfer of rights to the independent sector.

In 2016, Merlin opened an office in Tokyo, Japan, to expand its global operations.

In March 2018 the company entered into agreements with the three Chinese streaming services – NetEase, Alibaba, and Tencent – for digital music distribution in China. In May 2018, the company sold all of its Spotify shares for an estimated $125 million-plus, passing the proceeds on to its members. A landmark global licensing deal in December 2019 saw Merlin partnering with Boomplay Music.

In 2020, Jeremy Sirota joined Merlin as its second CEO. The organization expanded its deals to include Apple, Snap, and Triller.

In January 2021, Merlin held a "Celebrate Music" event. At the event, it unveiled a new brand, a new logo, and an updated website.

In August 2021, Feed Media Group, the B2B music licensing subscription service, signed a music licensing deal with Merlin, for its Adaptr product. Adaptr is a subscription-based platform. The deal provides access to a catalog of licensed music from Merlin member labels, distributors, and their artists.

In September 2021, Merlin and South Asian music and audio streaming service JioSaavn announced that they had extended and enhanced an existing music licensing partnership. The expanded partnership enabled Merlin’s membership to increase their presence in South Asia and expanded JioSaavn’s catalog offering to its worldwide audience.

Merlin added to its list of partners in October 2021 when it announced a deal with TREBEL, the maker of a licensed music app with on-demand and offline play sponsored by brand advertisers. The company ended the year by announcing an expanded licensing agreement with African music streaming service Boomplay.

In January 2022, Merlin partnered with UK-based Lickd to allow creators to legally use Merlin members' music in their YouTube videos.

Next, in early February 2022, Merlin announced a partnership with Twitch, the interactive live streaming service for content spanning gaming, entertainment, sports, music, and more. 

April 2022 saw the company announce a deal with FLO, a leading streaming application in Korea. 

In October 2022, Pinterest announced a deal to bring Merlin members' musical repertoire to its platform.  That month also saw a partnership announced with China-based short-form video platform Kuaishou.

Merlin announced two new partnerships in December of 2022: first with VR fitness app Supernatural and then with STYNGR, a gaming music platform.

Structure 
As of January 2022, Merlin's executive team is:

 Jeremy Sirota, CEO
 Charlie Lexton, COO 
 Adam Wright, CFO
 Jim Mahoney, SVP, Member & Partner Success

The current Board was elected in 2022 and is composed of:

 Pascal Bittard, Owner, IDOL
Marie Clausen, Managing Director North America, Ninja Tune
 Tom Deakin, Head of EMEA, AudioSalad
Michel Lambot, Co-founder, [PIAS]
Chris Maund, COO, Mushroom Labels
Carlos Mills, Founder & CEO, Mills Records
Martin Mills; Founder & Chairman, Beggars Group
 Sandra Ortega, Director of Global Partnerships, Altafonte
 Louis Posen, President & Executive Director, Hopeless Records
 Jason Taylor, Director of Sales & Label Relations, Redeye
Michael Ugwu, CEO, Freeme Digital
Darius Van Arman, Co-CEO of Secretly Group  (Appointed as Chairperson of Merlin's Board for 2022) 
Pieter van Rijn, CEO, FUGA
Horst Weidenmüller, CEO & Owner, !K7
Justin West, President & CEO, Secret City
 Yushi Yamashita, President, RightsScale

Advisory Board Members:

 Katie Alberts, COO, Reach Records
 Glen Barros, Managing Partner, Exceleration Music
 Rachel Buswell, Head of Digital Partnerships and Analytics, Domino
 Megan Jasper, CEO, Sub Pop Records

References

Digital rights
Music industry associations
Music organisations based in the Netherlands